Charlie Richard Hemphrey (born 31 August 1989) is an English cricketer. He has played professional cricket in England, Australia, and Wales. Hemphrey was born in Doncaster, Yorkshire, but grew up in Kent and was educated at the Harvey Grammar School, Folkestone.

After playing in second teams for English county cricket clubs Kent, Essex, and Derbyshire, Hemphrey emigrated to Brisbane, working briefly for an airline before signing for Queensland cricket team. He made his List A debut for Queensland on 9 October 2015 in the 2015–16 Matador BBQs One-Day Cup in Australia.

In January 2019, he was signed by Glamorgan County Cricket Club, ahead of the 2019 County Championship in England, before returning home permanently in early 2020.

Hemphrey has since gained residency in Australia, putting doubt on his cricketing career in England due to a three-year qualification period set by the England and Wales Cricket Board (ECB). Hemphrey was released by Glamorgan ahead of the 2021 County Championship.

References

External links
 
 Charlie Hemphrey at Wisden

1989 births
Living people
English cricketers
Cricketers from Doncaster
Queensland cricketers
Glamorgan cricketers
English cricketers of the 21st century
English emigrants to Australia
Australian cricketers
People educated at The Harvey Grammar School